Susan Katriona MacGregor  (born 30 August 1941) is a BBC Radio 4 broadcaster, perhaps best known as a former presenter of Woman's Hour and later the Today programme.

Early life
MacGregor was born in Oxford. Her parents were Scottish and emigrated to South Africa where she was brought up. Her father was a doctor, a neurologist, who, during the Second World War was in the Royal Army Medical Corps with the British 14th Army in Burma. She attended the Herschel Girls' School, an independent boarding school in Cape Town. She completed her education at the École de commerce in Neuchâtel, Switzerland, and at an English college called the House of Citizenship.

Career in broadcasting
For a time in London, she worked as a typist at Australia House, then became a temporary junior secretary at the BBC. This entitled her to an induction course, where she was taught the BBC's method of working.

Returning to South Africa, she began her broadcasting career there on the SABC's English-language radio service. Initially joining the BBC in 1967 as a reporter for The World At One, she hosted Woman's Hour from 1972 until 1987. In 1984, she became one of the hosts of BBC Radio 4's Today programme, a position she held until 2002.

That same year she was appointed a CBE for her services to broadcasting. MacGregor is a trustee of UNICEF and was a trustee of the John Ellerman Foundation. She is also on the Chancellor's Forum for the London Institute and an honorary graduate of several universities, among them the University of Nottingham, Nottingham Trent and Dundee.

She hosted The Reunion on BBC Radio 4 from 2003 to 2019.

In late 2010, she recorded her final episode as chair of the popular book programme A Good Read, also on BBC Radio 4. After seven years and approximately 500 book reviews, she was the show's longest serving presenter at the time.

Personal life
A friend of Helen Suzman, via her niece Janet Suzman, MacGregor used her local knowledge in BBC broadcasts over many years about the struggle against South Africa's apartheid system .

Her autobiography, Woman of Today, published in 2002, contained candid revelations and outlined her claimed relationships, including an affair with Leonard Rossiter.

References

1941 births
Living people
People from Oxford
BBC newsreaders and journalists
British radio personalities
Commanders of the Order of the British Empire
Woman's Hour
Alumni of Herschel Girls' School